Lieutenant General Ajai Singh PVSM, AVSM is a serving Indian Army general and the present Commander-in-Chief, Andaman and Nicobar Command (CINCAN). He assumed command from Lieutenant-General Manoj Pande, PVSM, AVSM, VSM on 1 June 2021.

Early life and education
Singh was born in an army family. He is a fifth-generation soldier, all of them in the cavalry or armoured corps. The family has been in the army for over 162 years. He attended The Lawrence School, Sanawar. He subsequently attended the National Defence Academy as part of the 63rd course. He then was part of the 73rd course of the Indian Military Academy.

He holds four master's degrees: an MBA with ORSA specialisation, an MSc in defence studies, an MPhil in defence and management studies and an MA in International Security and Strategy from Kings College, London.

Career
Singh was commissioned in the 81st Armoured Regiment on 17 December 1983. His father had raised the regiment a decade earlier. As a major, he commanded a rifle company of the Maratha Light Infantry during Operation Meghdoot and the Kargil War, receiving the COAS Commendation for Gallantry. He also served with MONUA in Angola as a United Nations military observer. 

Singh has attended a mountaineering course at the High Altitude Warfare School and tank gunnery & technology courses. He was also selected to attend a United Nations Senior Mission Leader Course in Indonesia as well as the Royal College of Defence Studies (RCDS), London.

General officer
Promoted to the rank of major general, Singh was appointed general officer commanding of a division. He then held the post of Additional Director General Military Operations (ADGMO) at Army headquarters. As a Lieutenant General he served as Director General Financial Planning and later Director General Military Training (DGMT) at Army HQ. On 30 July 2019, he was appointed the 30th general officer commanding X Corps at Bathinda.

Awards and decorations

Dates of rank

References

Living people
Year of birth missing (living people)
Indian Army officers
Indian generals
Commanders-in-Chief, Andaman and Nicobar Command
Recipients of the Ati Vishisht Seva Medal
Graduates of the Royal College of Defence Studies
Recipients of the Param Vishisht Seva Medal